Juniper Mesa Wilderness is a 7,406-acre (2,997 ha) wilderness area in the Prescott National Forest in the U.S. state of Arizona. The mesa is about an hour's drive northwest of Prescott in the Juniper Mountains of Yavapai County. It is entirely within the Juniper Mountain quadrangle of the United States Geological Survey (USGS) topographic map.

A landscape largely of granite surrounds the mesa of Tapeats sandstone and Martin and Redwall limestones, a relict of an ancient and more extensive version of the Colorado Plateau. Steep canyons cut through the mesa. Views to the south and east include Apache Creek Wilderness and parts of the Granite Mountain, Woodchute, and Sycamore Canyon wilderness areas.

Pinyon pine and Utah juniper dominate the southern slopes of the mesa, while ponderosa pine and alligator juniper are more prevalent on northern slopes. Frequently seen are black bear, elk, mule deer, bobcats, and Abert's squirrels.

Trails
Recreational opportunities include hiking, backpacking, horse riding, camping, wildlife viewing, and hunting for deer and small game. Multiple trails totalling  in length cross the wilderness.

It begins at Juniper Springs, on the east side of the mesa and ends where it meets Oaks and Willows Trail. Other connecting trails are Juniper Springs Trail and Bull Springs Trail.

See also
 List of Arizona Wilderness Areas
 List of U.S. Wilderness Areas
 Wilderness Act

References

Protected areas of Yavapai County, Arizona
Prescott National Forest
Wilderness areas of Arizona
Landforms of Yavapai County, Arizona
Mesas of Arizona
Mountains of Arizona
Protected areas established in 1984
1984 establishments in Arizona